Win Shein (born 31 July 1957 in Mandalay) is a former military officer and the incumbent Minister for Finance.

Career 
From May 2013 to May 2014, he also served as chairman of the Myanmar Investment Commission. Win Shein previously served as a Deputy Minister of Transportation from March 2011 to July 2012. He was Deputy Minister for Finance and Revenue from July to September 2012. He was an Myanmar Ambassador to Cambodia and was also nominated as Ambassador to France just before he was appointed as Deputy Minister. In the aftermath of the military-led 2021 Myanmar coup d'état, the Myanmar Armed Forces appointed Win Shein as the Minister for Finance effective 1 February 2021.

He also served as a Commodore, as part of the Myanmar Navy's Naval Training Headquarters.

Personal life 
Win Shein's father, San Shein, was formerly a member of the Burma Socialist Programme Party's central executive committee.

References

Finance ministers of Myanmar
Government ministers of Myanmar
Ambassadors of Myanmar to Cambodia
Living people
Burmese military personnel
Specially Designated Nationals and Blocked Persons List
1957 births
Individuals related to Myanmar sanctions